Mamadouba Bangoura (born 20 March 2000) is a Guinean professional footballer who plays as a forward for Iraq Premier League club Al-Minaa, and the Guinea national football team.

Career

Club
On 15 September 2022, Al-Minaa Club announced the signing of three professional players, including Bangoura.

International
On 21 September 2019, Bangoura won his first international cap with Guinea against Senegal in an African Nations Championship qualification.

Career statistics

International goals
Scores and results list Guinea's goal tally first.

Honours
Shkupi
 Macedonian First League runner-up: 2020–21

References

External links 
 
 

2000 births
Living people
Guinean footballers
Guinea international footballers
Association football forwards
AS Kaloum Star players
KF Shkupi players
CS Hammam-Lif players
Al-Mina'a SC players
Guinean expatriate footballers
Expatriate footballers in North Macedonia
Expatriate footballers in Tunisia
Guinean expatriate sportspeople in Tunisia
Expatriate footballers in Iraq
Guinean expatriate sportspeople in Iraq